was a junior college in Moriyama-ku, Nagoya, Aichi Prefecture, Japan. It was founded in 1950, and closed in 2004.

See also
 Kinjo Gakuin University

Universities and colleges in Nagoya
Educational institutions established in 1950
Japanese junior colleges
Private universities and colleges in Japan
Educational institutions disestablished in 2003
1950 establishments in Japan
2003 disestablishments in Japan